Glas Srpske is a daily newspaper published in Banja Luka, Republika Srpska, Bosnia and Herzegovina.

It was first issued as Glas in 1943 as a bulletin of the People's Liberation Movement in Bosnian Krajina region during World War II in Yugoslavia. For some time it went under the name Banjalučke novine and from 1963 it was again under the name Glas, until 1983 it was a daily newspaper. Since 2003 it goes under the name Glas Srpske and it is a private newspaper, one of eight newspapers in Bosnia and Herzegovina.

References

External links
Media.ba

Newspapers published in Bosnia and Herzegovina